Daniel Albert Naurits (born 22 March 1998) is an Estonian figure skater. He is the 2017 Nordic bronze medalist and a two-time Estonian national champion. He has competed in the final segment at three ISU Championships.

Career

Early years in Estonia 
Naurits began learning to skate in 2001. Early in his career, he represented Estonia, coached by Irina Kononova in Tallinn. His ISU Junior Grand Prix (JGP) came in October 2011. In March 2012, he competed at the World Junior Championships in Minsk, Belarus, but did not advance to the free skate. The Warsaw Cup in November 2012 was his final competition representing Estonia for four years.

Switch to France 
Naurits debuted internationally for France in April 2014 at the Triglav Trophy, where he won the junior silver medal. In the 2014–2015 season, he competed at two JGP events, placing 8th in Tallinn and 10th in Courchevel, France. He placed 7th competing on the senior level at the French Championships and later took the bronze medal at the French Junior Championships.

Naurits made his final international appearance for France in early October 2015, placing 13th at a JGP event in Logroño, Spain. He placed 6th as a senior at the French Championships in December 2015. During his time in France, he trained under Katia Gentelet in Nice.

Return to Estonia 
In the 2016–2017 season, Naurits was coached by Anna Levandi in Tallinn. He made his senior international debut and his return to representing Estonia in October 2016 at the Finlandia Trophy, a Challenger Series (CS) event at which he finished 14th. He won the Estonian national senior title in December 2016 and the junior title in January 2017.

In January, Naurits competed at the 2017 European Championships in Ostrava, Czech Republic. Ranked 24th in the short program, he obtained the final qualifying spot and then placed 20th in the free skate, resulting in a final placement of 22nd. He also qualified to the free skate at the 2017 World Junior Championships, finishing 20th in Taipei, Taiwan.

Coached by Liina-Grete Lilender, Naurits placed 21st at the 2018 European Championships in Moscow, Russia.

Programs

Competitive highlights 

CS: Challenger Series; JGP: Junior Grand Prix

References

External links 
 

1998 births
Estonian male single skaters
Living people
Figure skaters from Tallinn
Competitors at the 2019 Winter Universiade
French male single skaters